Icingtons (also known as French icingtons) are traditional wedding figurines made entirely of icing sugar. Icingtons are distinguishable from other wedding figurines by their organic soft look. They are placed on top of the wedding cake as a visual and symbolic mechanism.

Ingredients 

Icingtons consist of royal icing, also known as 'hard icing' or 'ready-to-roll icing', or sugar paste.

Origins 

The design of icingtons was inspired by classic French cinema of the 1940s and 1950s. They possessed a simple yet elegant aesthetic that encapsulated the on-screen sophistication of classic French actresses and actors. While the cake topper became popularized in America during the 1950s as a symbol of union, icingtons distinguished themselves by maintaining their elegance.

Differences between cake toppers 

Today, the words 'cake figurines' and 'cake toppers' are interchangeable. Cake toppers increasingly refer to figurines that are made of plastic, porcelain and now polymer clay. 
Figurines made of icing are traditionally referred to as icingtons. Some adopt the generic term 'sugar paste topper' to describe them, as these days  many sugar paste toppers are devoid of any French influences.

Artistry 

Icingtons have evolved from the kitchens of patisserie chefs and cake decorators displaying their skills in fondant, marzipan, and royal icing. Icing sugar creations are considered an art form in itself, and require a great deal of skill and craftsmanship, and may involve embossing, crimping, broderie anglaise, and Garret frills.
Modern-day icingtons have not strayed too far from the traditional - they still retain the suave, elegant look that mirror the French Classics.

References 

Wedding food
Marriage in France